State Highway 2 (SH 2) is a state highway in Jharkhand, India.

Route
SH 2 originates from its junction with NH 20 at Ramgarh Cantonment and passes through Barkakana, Bhurkunda, Bhadani Nagar, Balkundra, Patratu, Hesla, Pithuriya, Kanke and terminates at its junction with Ratu Aryapuri Road at Ranchi.

The total length of SH 2 is 57 km.

References

State Highways in Jharkhand